Between the Eyes is the debut album by Seattle-based rock band Love Battery. Sub Pop Records had initially released a single titled "Between the Eyes" in 1989. Tupelo Recordings then released Between the Eyes as an EP/mini-album in 1990 (with "Licensed by Sub Pop" printed on the artwork). Sub Pop then solely released the final version in 1991, which expanded the album with three additional tracks.

Critical reception
The single landed at #36 on Paste'''s list of the "50 Best Grunge Songs"; Paste called the LP "a stripped-down, gut-churning collection of gritty guitars and vox." The Stranger wrote that the LP, and its follow-up, Dayglo'', "remain psychedelic twin towers" in the catalog of Sub Pop.

Track listing
All songs written by Love Battery (except where noted).

1991 LP
"Between the Eyes" - 4:28
"Easter" - 4:10
"Highway of Souls" - 5:25
"Orange" - 3:01
"2 and 2" - 2:25
"Before I Crawl" - 2:37
"Ibiza Bar" (Pink Floyd) - 3:00
"67" - 2:45
"Wings" - 3:12
"Shellshock" - 3:18

 1990 EP
"Between the Eyes" - 4:28
"Easter" - 4:10
"Highway of Souls" - 5:25
"Orange" - 3:01
"2 and 2" - 2:25
"Before I Crawl" - 2:37
"Ibiza Bar" (Pink Floyd) - 3:00

 1989 single
"Between the Eyes" - 4:28
"Easter" - 4:10

Personnel
Art Chantry - Artwork
Jason Finn - Drums
Ron Nine - Vocals, guitar
Tommy "Bonehead" Simpson - Bass (Tracks: 1-7)
Jim Tillman - Bass (Tracks 8-10)
Kevin Whitworth - Guitar

References

1992 debut albums
Sub Pop albums
Love Battery albums
Albums produced by Steve Fisk
Albums produced by Jack Endino